Edzard I, also Edzard the Great (15 January 1462 in Greetsiel – 14 February 1528 in Emden) was count of East Frisia from 1491 until his death in 1528.

Edzard succeeded his brother Enno in 1492. He fought with George, Duke of Saxony over Friesland and Groningen. The city of Groningen accepted him as its lord in 1506, but in 1514 renounced him again in favor of Charles of Guelders.

After he returned from a pilgrimage to Jerusalem in 1492, he took over the rule of East Frisia together with his mother Theda. After his mother died in 1494, he ruled together with his less significant brother Uko.

Edzard's rule was characterized by his energetic approach against his opponents, the East Frisian leaders Hero Oomkens from Harlingerland and Edo Wiemken from Jever, whom he quickly managed to subdue. He was also a supporter of the Protestant Reformation in his territories, through the creation of new East Frisian laws, the reform of the coinage and the introduction of primogeniture for his house, the house of Cirksena.

His foreign policies led to a three-year war (1514–1517) against Duke George of Saxony. The war was mostly fought on East Frisian territory, and caused destruction in large areas. The city of Aurich, for example, was burned to the ground.

Duke George of Saxony was appointed stadtholder of all Frisian territories in 1514 by Maximilian I, Holy Roman Emperor. This was not accepted by the city of Groningen. Count Edzard saw this as a chance to expand his influence in the province of Groningen, and proclaimed himself protector of the city. As a result, 24 German dukes and counts invaded the Frisian lands with their troops and devastated the region. Edzard was proclaimed an outlaw (Reichsacht) by the emperor.

During the three-year war, Edzard eventually managed to keep the majority of East Frisia under his control. Only when Charles V came to power in the Netherlands did Edzard manage to end the war by getting himself confirmed as ruler of East Frisia.

Marriage and children 
He married in 1498 with Elisabeth of Rietberg-Arnsberg (1470–1512), daughter of John I, Count of Rietberg and had 3 children :
 Margaret (1500–1537), married with Philipp IV, Count of Waldeck Margaret became the mother of Margaretha von Waldeck. Margaretha von Waldeck was believed to be the inspiration of Snow White.
 Enno (1505–1540), his successor
 Johan (1506–1574)

See also

 Frisians

References

1461 births
1528 deaths
Counts of East Frisia
Medieval Knights of the Holy Sepulchre